Paul 'Tier' Schoeman is a South African rugby union player for the  in Top League. His regular position is number 8.

Career

In June 2014, he was selected in the starting line-up for the  side to face  during a tour match during a 2014 incoming tour. He played the entire match as the Kings suffered a 12–34 defeat.

He made his Currie Cup debut for the Eastern Province Kings against the Blue Bulls in their third match of the 2014 season at Loftus Versfeld.

He signed a two-year contract with Bloemfontein-based side  prior to the 2016 season.

He made his Super Rugby debut for the Cheetahs in their opening match of 2016 against the Jaguares.

References

South African rugby union players
Eastern Province Elephants players
People from Cradock, Eastern Cape
Living people
1992 births
Rugby union flankers
Rugby union number eights
Cheetahs (rugby union) players
Free State Cheetahs players
Bulls (rugby union) players
Mie Honda Heat players
Rugby union players from the Eastern Cape